The IS-3 was the basis of a family of high performance gliders designed by Iosif Şilimon and built in Romania in the 1950s at the URMV-3 (Rom: Uzinele de Reparatii Material Volant-3 - Glider repair and manufacture factory) factory at Braşov.

Design and development
The IS-3 was designed as a high performance sailplane for record-breaking and international competition flying. The development of the IS-3 was in four distinct phases with differences in wing position and construction as well as fuselage design. The original glider, first flown on 19 August 1953, was built primarily of wood with a pod and boom style fuselage and high-set wings. The streamlined pod contained the enclosed cockpit with flush fitting canopy and supported the wings and the Duralumin sheet tubular tailboom which supported the conventional tail surfaces at its extremity. The tapered wings were built with plywood-covered torsion box leading edges with fabric covering aft of the main spar, incorporating spoilers for approach control and differential ailerons to reduce adverse yaw. With the exception of the IS-3c and IS-3d the IS-3 family followed the pod and boom arrangement with variations in wing position, span, wing construction and undercarriage arrangement.

All versions had a single mainwheel with nose and tail skids, varying in skid sizes and mainwheel position. The IS-3c and IS-3d were drastically different in having a conventional wooden fuselage and further minor variations in wing construction and roll controls.

Operational history
Data from: Romanian Aeronautical Constructions 1905-1974
IS-3The IS-3 set several national records, at a 1954 international gliding contest at Leszno in Poland and at other times:
Speed -  over a  straight line with reference point, piloted by Mircea Finescu at Lesno.
Distance -  straight line with reference point, piloted by Mircea Finescu at Leszno.
Speed -  over a  triangular circuit, piloted by Mircea Finescu at Leszno.
Distance (women) -  straight line between Iași and Cuza Vodă, Călărași, piloted by Aurelia Roşianu-Gheorghiu.
IS-3dThe IS-3d set several national records:
Speed -  over a  triangular circuit, piloted by Ovidiu Popa.
Speed (women) -   over a  triangular circuit, piloted by Aurelia Roşianu-Gheorghiu.

Variants
Data from: Romanian Aeronautical Constructions 1905-1974
IS-3Original prototype with high-set  span wings on a pod and boom fuselage, with two part differential ailerons and non-speed-limiting airbrakes/spoilers.
IS-3aA revised IS-3 with wings lowered to the mid position and tailboom also lowered. The IS-3a wings were similar to the plywood D-box and fabric covered aft section of the IS-3 but incorporated flaps with two part differential ailerons and non-speed-limiting airbrakes/spoilers.
IS-3bThe IS-3b was essentially identical to the IS-3a with the exception of having no flaps and having plywood skinned wings throughout.
IS-3cThe IS-3c was markedly different from its predecessors in having high-set  span wings, skinned throughout with plywood, with three section differential ailerons and introducing speed-limiting airbrakes.  The new long span wing was supported by a conventional fuselage, incorporating the streamlined enclosed cockpit and a conventional tail unit.
IS-3dEssentially similar to the IS-3c, but with a  wing, single-section ailerons and streamlined wing-tip fairings and speed limiting airbrakes.
IS-3eReverting to the pod and boom layout the IS-3e had high-set  span wings, with plywood D-box and fabric covered aft section, two section ailerons and speed limiting airbrakes.
IS-3fA variant with a  wing completely skinned with plywood, otherwise similar to the IS-3e.

Specifications (IS-3)

Notes

References

1950s Romanian sailplanes
Glider aircraft